Bemba may refer to:
 Bemba language (Chibemba), a Bantu language spoken in Zambia
 Bemba people (AbaBemba), an ethnic group of central Africa
 Jean-Pierre Bemba, the former vice-President of the Democratic Republic of Congo
 A Caribbean drum, used in the music of Trinidad and Tobago and also spelled bembe
Bemba, a creator god in Bambara mythology.

Language and nationality disambiguation pages